The Bedford CF was a range of full-size panel vans produced by Bedford. The van was introduced in 1969 to replace the CA model, and was sized to compete directly with the Ford Transit, which had entered production four years earlier. Its design was similar to its American counterpart, the Chevrolet Van (1971–1995).

Bedford was a General Motors subsidiary, and in some markets outside the United Kingdom and Ireland the CF was sold through Opel dealers as the Opel Bedford Blitz from 1973 on when the original Opel Blitz was phased out. In other markets such as in Norway the CF retained its original name.

The CF was notable for being the last solely Vauxhall-engineered vehicle when it was discontinued in 1987 (the last Vauxhall passenger car had been the HC Viva which had ceased production in 1979); since all Vauxhall models by that point had switched to being based on Opel platforms. The Bedford brand continued on certain badge engineered light van designs from Isuzu and Suzuki, before being retired in 1991.

CF
Introduced in November 1969 to replace the 17-year-old Bedford CA, the CF van variants soon became some of the most popular light commercial vehicles on British roads.

The CF could be specified with a sliding door in the side panel directly behind the passenger door, and it was generally with this layout that the van was also commonly used as a base vehicle for a caravanette.

The engine was the well-proven Slant Four engine which had been introduced for the Vauxhall FD Victor models in 1967. A four-cylinder  Perkins diesel engine could be specified for an extra £130 (1969), while a larger  version was used for heavier versions. These units were rated at  DIN. In 1976, a  overhead valve (OHV) diesel engine from Opel replaced the outdated Perkins units.

This was as an answer to the rival Ford Transit range, which in Australia used six-cylinder engines from the Ford Falcon.

The Bedford used the same basic suspension lay-out as the Vauxhall Victor, though married to greater wheel arch clearances and calibrated for greater weight carrying capacity. The front independent suspension featured a double wishbone layout with coil springs and telescopic shock absorbers, while the rear wheels were suspended by a combination involving a live axle and traditional long single-leaf springs.

Several different manual transmissions were used: the Vauxhall three-speed, four-speed, Bedford four-speed, ZF four-speed, ZF five-speed, and the General Motors automatic. The Laycock type of overdrive was available to order or on the later Vauxhall four-speed models.

There were three CF1 body styles. A standard panel van which was intended to rival the Ford Transit; the special van body (essentially a self-contained cab with a general-purpose chassis onto which a wide range of custom-built bodies or beds could be built), and the Dormobile (caravanette).

CF1

Units exported to Germany (Bedford Blitz) received a smaller,  diesel, producing . This engine was also installed in many other export markets where tax categories suited engines with less than two litres of displacement, such as the Benelux countries and Finland. The 1.8 and 2.3 litre petrol units remained the same.

The restyled front end was engineered so that by removing 8 bolts the whole front panel could be completely removed, providing easy access to the engine so it could be removed from the front instead of from underneath like on the CF1.

The CF1 "facelift" is often confused with being a CF2 because it's difficult to tell them apart from the exterior.
The easiest visual check is that the CF facelift will have the same old metallic door handles and mirrors as the CF1 while on the CF2 have new plastic ones.

CF2

In 1984 the CF was renamed CF2 and basically only received mechanical upgrades.

New transmissions were also available:
 4-speed GM all-synchromesh gearbox on short-wheelbase models;
 ZF 5-speed overdrive all-synchromesh gearbox standard on all long-wheelbase models and optional on others;
 GM automatic transmission optional on most models;
 Choice of axle ratios on nearly all models.

And new efficient brakes:
 Front disc brakes with self-adjusting rear drums on CF2/230 to CF2/280;
 Self-adjusting drums all around on CF2/350 models;
 Load-sensing valve standard on all models.

In 1985 the CF2 was sold side by side in UK with the Bedford Midi - a smaller, badge engineered version of the Isuzu Fargo which was locally built at the newly established IBC Vehicles venture with Isuzu.

By then the CF's replacement was put on hold and then ultimately dropped when Bedford decided that rebadging other GM owned brands was much cheaper. The last CF2s were sold in the UK in 1987 and marked the end of original Bedford designed vehicles.

CF Electric
One noteworthy variant, the CF Electric was introduced in 1982. It was the first mass-produced electrically powered vehicle based on a fossil fuel vehicle platform. It was built in partnership between Bedford, Lucas, Chloride Group and the UK government on a 5-year grant scheme. The batteries were housed in a compartment below the floor and the traction came from a motor placed at the rear with a step down reduction gearbox coupled to the CF's standard differential, but turned through 180'.
The motor control system was housed under the bonnet and a small diesel heater provided cabin heating. The system also featured regenerative braking, however this could be turned off as it was found that in wet conditions the motor could lock the rear wheels up in a similar way as applying the handbrake. Most were sold to government agencies, the Royal Mail and local authorities. However, with a price tag much higher than a standard CF, and battery technology at the time not advancing the government scheme wound down in 1987, and the model was withdrawn and spares for it soon dried up.

A heavily modified version of the CF Electric was also exported in left-hand drive form into the United States where it was rebadged and sold as the GMC Griffon. It had a payload of around 1,000 kg and a GVW of 3401 kg, being much heavier than the original British van, sitting at a curb weight of around 2,494 kg which was made so it could be slotted with the full-size Chevrolet Van and GMC Vandura lines, although it was slightly shorter in length compared to its American counterparts. Over 30 of these vans were exported but the program was presumably cut alongside its British variant in 1987 due to the van being withdrawn from the market. This version was notable for being the first electric van sold by GM in the US, a position they would not come back in until VIA Motors started converting Chevrolet Express vans into electric vehicles as the VTRUX Van.

Commercial
The Bedford CF van was the second most popular van in the UK, second only to the Ford Transit. Along with the Transit, the CF was usefully wider than competitor vehicles from Austin-Morris, Rootes and Volkswagen. It was also the most common caravanette. CFs were popular with customisers throughout the 1970s and 1980s.

Users

The Bedford CF was widely used. British police forces, in particular, used them for prisoner transport and as riot vans. They were also used by the Garda Síochána (Republic of Ireland police). Some ambulance services kept them in service for longer than usual after production ended as they were liked by crews. The British Military also had a fleet of CFs. They were used by builders and builders' merchants, as well as by courier services and the Post Office. They were also a popular caravanette due to their space and reasonable fuel consumption. They were used as ice cream vans in Britain and Australia.

A heavily modified CF was used as the Mystery Machine in Scooby-Doo: The Movie 2002.

Discontinuation 
Initially, Bedford wanted to enter a joint venture with Leyland Motors to produce a replacement for the Bedford CF but these plans never caught on, since the British government did not want one of their major truck manufacturers to be controlled by a foreign company. Following economic problems and declining sales by Bedford, it was decided to divest the once legendary company with the Luton plant being re-organized as a joint venture with Isuzu and renamed to IBC Vehicles while the Dunstable plant was sold to AWD Trucks. In 1986, the Isuzu Fargo started getting produced by IBC as the Bedford Midi with local modifications for the European market. GM Europe would not return in the large panel van market until 1997 and 1998 when production of the Renault-based Opel/Vauxhall Arena and Movano started, both of which serve as the true successors to the CF range. Vauxhall continued producing the taillights for the CF until 2000 (by which time the Arena and Movano came out) in order to supply them to Bristol Cars for use in the Bristol Britannia.

Technical specifications
1969

1972

107.4 cu. in. (1759 cc) and 139 cu. in. (2279 cc) Vauxhall low compression OHC engines introduced from chassis number 2V610007.

1973

1978

From chassis number HY600001

1979

1982

Facelift models introduced (preceded by Facelift dash and wiring introduced 1981)

1984

CF2 models introduced.

Opel 1979 cc CIH petrol engine replaced Vauxhall 1759 cc and 2239 cc OHC petrol engine.

References

External links 

 Bedford CF Org Furthering interest in the preservation, history and active use of the Bedford CF
 UK Bedford CF Van Club UK technical/enthusiasts/members website.
 CF-UK: The Bedford CF Web Site - CF enthusiasts' forum and website
 Video clips
 1972 Bedford CF1
 1975 Bedford CF1
 Images
 CF1 Flat bed
 CF2 Dormobile
 CF2 Special body Caravanette.
 Late CF2 camper

CF
Rear-wheel-drive vehicles
Vans
Vehicles introduced in 1969
Minibuses
Road vehicles manufactured in the United Kingdom